Dejopeja (minor planet designation: 184 Dejopeja) is a large M-type Main belt asteroid. It was discovered by Johann Palisa on February 28, 1878, and was named after Deiopea, a Roman nymph.

This is an X-type asteroid with a diameter of 66 km and a geometric albedo of 0.190. Based upon Photometric observations taken during 2000, it has a synodic rotation period of 6.441 ± 0.001 h. The light curve is tri-modal, most likely due to an angular shape, with a peak-to-peak amplitude of 0.19 ± 0.01 in magnitude.

References

External links 
 
 

Background asteroids
Dejopeja
Dejopeja
X-type asteroids (Tholen)
X-type asteroids (SMASS)
18780228